General Fusion is a Canadian company based in Vancouver, British Columbia, which is developing a fusion power device based on magnetized target fusion (MTF). The company was founded in 2002 by Dr. Michel Laberge. The company has more than 200 employees in three countries, with additional centers co-located with fusion research laboratories near London, and Oak Ridge, Tennessee, US.

The device under development injects the magnetized target, a plasma mass in the form of a compact toroid, into a cylinder of spinning liquid metal. The target is mechanically compressed to fusion-relevant densities and pressures, by anywhere from a dozen to hundreds (in various designs) of steam-driven pistons.

In 2018, the firm published papers on a spherical tokamak, instead of a toroid. It is unclear if this represents a major design change. In June 2021, the company announced it would build 70% of a full scale fusion demonstration plant in the UK as part of a public-private partnership with the UK Government.

Organization 
General Fusion's management team has expertise in technology program development, fusion engineering and science, and product commercialization. 

General Fusion's CEO is Greg Twinney, CTO is Ryan Guerrero, and SVP is Michael Cappello.

Michel Laberge, Chief Science Officer, holds multiple responsibilities at General Fusion, including building partnerships with international research institutions, and overseeing partnerships with governments and other companies, and technology development strategy. He earned a PhD in physics from the University of British Columbia in 1990, and completed research at the École Polytechnique and the National Research Council of Canada. Before founding General Fusion, Laberge worked as a senior physicist and principal engineer at Creo Products for nine years. He cofounded residential demand response technology company Energate, Inc. He also worked as a design engineer on robotic systems for the International Space Station (ISS).

The board of directors is chaired by Klaas De Boer, who currently chairs AIM-listed Xeros Technology Group and serves on the Boards of SmartKem and vasopharm.

Technology 

General Fusion's magnetized target fusion system uses a ~3 meter sphere filled with a mix of molten liquid lead and lithium. The liquid is spun, creating a vertical cavity in the centre of the sphere. This vortex flow is established and maintained by an external pumping system; liquid flows into the sphere through tangentially directed ports at the equator and exits radially through ports near the poles of the sphere.

A plasma injector is attached to the top of the sphere, from which a pulse of magnetically confined deuterium-tritium plasma fuel is injected into the center of the vortex. A few milligrams of gas are used per pulse. The gas is ionized by a bank of capacitors to form a spheromak plasma (self-confined magnetized plasma rings) composed of the deuterium–tritium fuel.

The outside of the sphere is covered with steam pistons, which push the liquid metal and collapse the vortex, thereby compressing the plasma. The compression increases the density and temperature of the plasma to the range where the fuel atoms fuse, releasing energy in the form of fast neutrons and alpha particles.This energy heats the liquid metal, which is then pumped through a heat exchanger to generate electricity via a steam turbine. The plasma forming and compressing process repeats and the liquid metal is continuously pumped through the system. Some of the steam is recycled to power the pistons.

In addition to its role in compressing the plasma, the liquid metal liner shields the power plant structure from neutrons released by the deuterium-tritium fusion reaction, overcoming the problem of structural damage to plasma-facing materials. The lithium in the mixture breeds tritium.

Linus 

General Fusion's approach is based on the Linus concept developed by the United States Naval Research Laboratory (NRL) beginning in 1972. Researchers at NRL suggested an approach that retains many of the advantages of liner compression to achieve small-scale, high-energy-density fusion.

In the Linus concept, a rotating liquid lithium liner is imploded mechanically, using high pressure helium as the energy source. The liner acts as a cylindrical piston to compress a magnetically confined plasma adiabatically to fusion temperature and relatively high density (~1017 ions.cm−3). In the subsequent expansion the plasma energy and the fusion energy carried by trapped alpha particles is directly recovered, making the mechanical cycle self-sustaining.

The liquid metal acts as both a compression mechanism and heat transfer mechanism, allowing the energy from the fusion reaction to be captured as heat. Linus researchers anticipated that the liner could also be used to breed tritium fuel for the power plant, and would protect the machine from high-energy neutrons.

According to Laberge, Linus could not properly time the compression using the technology of the era. Faster computers provide the required timing. However, various Linus devices with no timing constraints, including systems using single pistons, were built during the experimental runs during the 1970s and demonstrated fully reversible compression strokes.

Fusion Demonstration Program 
The Fusion Demonstration Program is a 70% scale prototype which is being built in Oxfordshire, UK with a reported cost of US$400 million. The plant is to commence operations in 2027.
 
The plant has several key differences from the commercial power plant concept:

 70% scale.
 1 pulse per day repetition rate vs 1 pulse per second for a power plant.
 Among other things this increases the time available to re-establish the high vacuum conditions required for plasma formation by a factor of 86400, avoiding a significant engineering obstacle that will need to be solved for any future commercial application to be viable.
 Drive gas system using helium rather than hydraulic rams.
 A compression system using liquid lithium rather than lead-lithium.
 Ideally plasma facing materials should be composed of light elements. Plasma contamination by heavier elements, such as lead, significantly increase plasma power loss due to Bremsstrahlung radiation. The choice of lithium rather than lead-lithium therefore significantly reduces plasma power losses making the demonstration program much more viable than it otherwise would be. However, this comes at the expense of having to solve materials compatability issues with lithium rather than lead-lithium as will be necessary for any future power plant.

History 
The firm was founded in 2002 by former Creo Products senior physicist and principal engineer Michel Laberge. 

In 2005 it produced a fusion reaction in its first MTF prototype. In 2010, it produced its first at-scale plasma injector with magnetically confined plasma. In 2011 it first demonstrated compressive heating of magnetized plasma.

A proof-of-concept compression system was constructed in 2013 with 14 full size pistons arranged around a 1 meter diameter spherical compression chamber to demonstrate pneumatic compression and collapse of a liquid metal vortex. The pneumatic pistons were used to create a converging spherical wave to compress the liquid metal. The 100 kg, 30 cm diameter hammer pistons were driven down a 1 m long bore by compressed air. The hammer piston struck an anvil at the end of the bore, generating a large amplitude acoustic pulse that was transmitted to the liquid metal in the compression chamber. To create a spherical wave, the timing of these strikes had to be controlled to within 10 µs. The firm recorded sequences of consecutive shots with impact velocities of 50 m/s and timing synchronized within 2 µs. However it was found that the wall of the liquid metal vortex turned to a spray soon after the 
arrival of the pressure wave.

From its inception until 2016, the firm built more than a dozen plasma injectors. These include large two-stage injectors with formation and magnetic acceleration sections (dubbed "PI" experiments), and three generations of smaller, single-stage formation-only injectors (MRT, PROSPECTOR and SPECTOR). The firm published research demonstrating SPECTOR lifespans of up to 2 milliseconds and temperatures in excess of 400 eV.

As of 2016, the firm had developed the power plant's subsystems, including plasma injectors and compression driver technology. Patents were awarded in 2006 for a fusion energy reactor design, and enabling technologies such as plasma accelerators (2015), methods for creating liquid metal vortexes (2016) and lithium evaporators (2016).

In 2016 the GF design used compact toroid plasmas formed by a coaxial Marshal gun (a type of plasma railgun), with magnetic fields supported by internal plasma currents and eddy currents in the flux conserver wall. In 2016, the firm reported plasma lifetimes up to 2 milliseconds and electron temperatures in excess of 400 eV (4,800,000 °C).

Around 2017 the company performed a series of experiments referred to as PCS (Plasma Compression Small). These implosion experiments used a chemical driver (a euphemism for an explosive) to compress an aluminum liner onto a compact toroid plasma. This is a very similar process to that used in implosion type nuclear weapons such as The Gadget. Because the implosions involved chemical explosives, the tests took place outdoors in remote locations. The tests were destructive and could only be executed every few months. These tests were carried out to advance the understanding of plasma compression with the goal of advancing toward a nuclear-reactor scale demonstration.

, the PI3 plasma injector held the title as the world's most powerful plasma injector, ten times more powerful than its predecessor. It also achieved stable compression of plasma.

In 2019 it successfully confined plasma within its liquid metal cavity. From 2019-2021 it increased plasma performance.

As of 2021, the firm had approximately 140 employees and had raised over C$150 million in funding from a global syndicate of investors. It demonstrated compression of a water cavity into a controlled, symmetrical shape.

Also in 2021 the company agreed to build a demonstration plant in Oxfordshire, at Culham, the center of the UK's nuclear R&D. The plant is planned to be 70% of the size of a commercial power plant. The company claimed it had validated all the individual components for the demonstration reactor.

In 2022, the company announced that it had completed 200,000+ plasma shots, filed 150 patents/patents pending, and that headcount had passed 200. PI3 reached 10 ms confinement times and temperatures of 250 eV, almost 3 million degrees Celsius, without active magnetic stabilization, auxiliary heating, or a conventional divertor. Its primary compression testbed, a 1:10 scale system using water rather than liquid metal, has completed over 1,000 shots, behaving as predicted.

As of 2023 the company is yet to demonstrate mechanical compression of a plasma within a liquid metal vortex.

Research collaborations 
 Microsoft: In May 2017 General Fusion and Microsoft announced a collaboration to develop a data science platform based on Microsoft's Azure cloud computing system. A second phase of the project was to apply machine learning to the data, with the goal of discovering insights into the behavior of high temperature plasmas. The new computational program would enable General Fusion to mine over 100 terabytes of data from the records of over 150,000 experiments. It was to use this data to optimize the designs of their fusion system's plasma injector, piston array, and fuel chamber. During this collaboration, the Microsoft Develop Experience Team was to contribute their experience and resources in machine learning, data management, and cloud computing.
 Los Alamos National Laboratory: General Fusion entered a cooperative research and development agreement (CRADA) with the U.S. Department of Energy's Los Alamos National Laboratory for magnetized target fusion research.
 McGill University: In 2017 McGill University and General Fusion acquired an Engage Grant from the Natural Sciences and Engineering Research Council of Canada to study General Fusion's technology. Specifically, the project was to use McGill's diagnostic abilities to develop techniques to understand the behavior of the liquid metal wall during plasma compression and how it might affect the plasma.
 Princeton Plasma Physics Laboratory: In 2016 the two created an MHD simulation of compression during MTF experiments
 Queen Mary University of London: In 2015 General Fusion funded a research study on high fidelity simulations of non-linear sound propagation in multiphase media of nuclear fusion reactor pursued using QMUL CLithium and Y codes.
 Hatch Ltd: General Fusion and Hatch Ltd. joined in 2015 to create a fusion energy demonstration system. The project aimed to construct and demonstrate, at power plant scale, the primary subsystems and physics underpinning General Fusion's technology, including their proprietary Magnetized Target Fusion (MTF) technology. Simulation models will be used to verify that this fusion energy system is commercially and technically viable at scale.
Culham Centre for Fusion Energy: In June 2021, General Fusion announced it would accept the UK government's offer to host the world's first substantial public-private partnership fusion demonstration plant, at Culham. The plant will be constructed from 2022 to 2025 and is intended to lead the way for commercial pilot plants in the late 2020s or early 2030s. The plant will be 70% of full scale and is expected to attain a stable plasma of 150 million degrees using deuterium fuel. In October 2022 the UKAEA and General Fusion elaborated on the nature of their partnership, stating that it will "harness UKAEA’s extensive neutron modelling software and expertise to simulate the neutron flux distribution from General Fusion’s operational large-scale plasma injector", including by building a new, larger Thomson scattering system for General Fusion’s demonstration machine.

Funding 
As of 2021, General Fusion had received $430 million in funding.

Rounds 
Investors included Chrysalix venture capital, the Business Development Bank of Canada—a Canadian federal Crown corporation, Bezos Expeditions, Cenovus Energy, Pender Ventures, Khazanah Nasional—a Malaysian sovereign wealth fund, and Sustainable Development Technology Canada (STDC).

Chrysalix Energy Venture Capital, a Vancouver-based venture capital firm, led a C$1.2 million seed round of financing in 2007. Other Canadian venture capital firms that participated in the seed round were GrowthWorks Capital and BDC Venture Capital.

In 2009, a consortium led by General Fusion was awarded C$13.9 million by SDTC to conduct a four-year research project on "Acoustically Driven Magnetized Target Fusion"; SDTC is a foundation established by the Canadian government. The other member of the consortium is Los Alamos National Laboratory.

A 2011 Series B round raised $19.5 million from a syndicate including Bezos Expeditions, Braemar Energy Ventures, Business Development Bank of Canada, Cenovus Energy, Chrysalix Venture Capital, Entrepreneurs Fund, and Pender Ventures.

In May 2015 the government of Malaysia's sovereign wealth fund, Khazanah Nasional Berhad, led a $27 million funding round.

SDTC awarded General Fusion a further C$12.75 million in March 2016 to for the project "Demonstration of fusion energy technology" in a consortium with McGill University (Shock Wave Physics Group) and Hatch Ltd.

In October 2018 Canadian Minister for Innovation, Science and Economic Development, Navdeep Bains, announced that the Canadian government's Strategic Innovation Fund would invest C$49.3 million in General Fusion.

In December 2019, General Fusion raised $65 million in Series E equity financing from Singapore's Temasek Holdings, Bezos and Chrisalix, concurrently with another $38 million from Canada's Strategic Innovation Fund. The firm said the funds would permit it to begin the design, construction, and operation of its Fusion Demonstration Plant.

In January 2021, the company announced funding by Shopify founder Tobias Lütke's Thistledown Capital.

In November  2021, the company completed an over-subscribed $130M Series E round. Investors included Bezos, Business Development Bank of Canada, hedge fund Segra Capital Management and family-office investors. Funds were to be dedicated to constructing a commercial reactor.

Crowdsourced innovations 
Beginning in 2015, the firm conducted three crowdsourcing challenges through Waltham, Massachusetts-based firm Innocentive.

The first challenge was Method for Sealing Anvil Under Repetitive Impacts Against Molten Metal. General Fusion successfully sourced a solution for "robust seal technology" capable of withstanding extreme temperatures and repetitive hammering, so as to isolate the rams from the liquid metal that fills the sphere. The firm awarded Kirby Meacham, an MIT-trained mechanical engineer from Cleveland, Ohio, the $20,000 prize.

A second challenge, Data-Driven Prediction of Plasma Performance, began in December 2015 with the aim of identifying patterns in the firm's experimental data that would allow it to further improve the performance of its plasma.

The third challenge ran in March 2016, seeking a method to induce a substantial current to jump a 5–10 cm gap within a few hundred microseconds, and was titled "Fast Current Switch in Plasma Device". A prize of $5,000 was awarded to a post-doctoral researcher at Notre Dame.

See also 
 China Fusion Engineering Test Reactor
 DEMOnstration Power Plant (DEMO)
 Fusion Industry Association
 Helion Energy
 History of nuclear fusion
 ITER
 Lockheed Martin Compact Fusion Reactor
 Spherical Tokamak for Energy Production
 TAE Technologies
 TerraPower
 Tokamak Energy

References

Readings

External links 
 
 

Fusion power
Technology companies of Canada
Engineering companies of Canada
Companies based in Burnaby